William Harris (probably c. 1900 - possibly 1930s) was an American country blues guitarist, singer, and songwriter. He recorded sixteen songs between 1927 and 1928, of which fourteen were released on record. AllMusic noted that Harris was "a fine second-level blues and folksong performer". His best known works are "Kansas City Blues," "Early Mornin' Blues," and "Hot Time Blues."

Details of Harris's life outside of his brief recording career are minimal.

Life and career
Harris's date and place of birth are unknown, but there is a general consensus among blues historians that he probably originated in the Mississippi Delta area. He was one of the earliest "discoveries" made by the white businessman H. C. Speir, who ran a music and mercantile store on Farish Street, in a black neighborhood of Jackson, Mississippi. It is thought that around this time, Harris was a performer with a traveling medicine show, probably with F. S. Wolcott's Rabbit Foot Minstrels. The lyrical content of some of his recorded work suggests that Harris spent some of his formative years in Alabama.

What is known is that he recorded sixteen tracks in two separate sessions in 1927 and 1928 for Gennett Records. His first recording session took place in Birmingham, Alabama, on July 18, 1927. His second and final session occurred over three days in October 1928, in Richmond, Indiana, in which he recorded a cover version of Jim Jackson's big-selling track "Kansas City Blues". Jackson was also a singer in a medicine show, and it is presumed that the two men knew each other from that time. Another of Harris's recordings, "Hot Time Blues", was based on an earlier song, "Take Me Back", which had been recorded by two other regulars on the medicine circuit, Frank Stokes and Papa Charlie Jackson. Harris accompanied himself on guitar, which he mainly treated as a rhythm instrument, unlike those who followed him in the Delta blues tradition. To add to the confusion, some of the Gennett recordings were later reissued on the subsidiary labels Champion, Supertone, and Conqueror, with the tracks "Electric Chair Blues" and "Kansas City Blues" credited to Alonso Boone, and two other 10-inch 78-rpm shellac singles were credited to Bud Johnson.

Nothing is known of Harris's life after his recording career ended.

Most of Harris's known work has been compiled on an album released by Document Records, which also contains tracks recorded by Buddy Boy Hawkins.

Songs
"Bad Treated Blues"
"Bullfrog Blues"
"Early Mornin' Blues"
"Electric Chair Blues (Jefferson County Blues)"
"Gonna Get Me a Woman That I Calls My Own"
"Hot Time Blues"
"I'm a Roving Gambler"
"I'm Leaving Town"
"I Was Born in the Country, Raised in Town"
"Kansas City Blues"
"Keep Your Man Out of Birmingham"
"Kitchen Range Blues"
"Leavin' Here Blues"
"Police & High Sheriff Come"

Selected compilation album

See also
List of country blues musicians

References

External links
Blog concerning Harris's work

Year of birth missing
Year of death missing
African-American guitarists
African-American male singers
American male singers
African-American songwriters
American male songwriters
Country blues musicians
American blues guitarists
American blues singers
Gennett Records artists
American male guitarists